The Tucha Range is a small subrange of the Swannell Ranges of the Omineca Mountains, located north of Ingenika River and south of Tucha Creek in northern British Columbia, Canada.

References

Tucha Range in the Canadian Mountain Encyclopedia

Swannell Ranges